Ernesto Simpson (born March 10, 1964) is a Cuban (Camagüey, Cuba) drummer of World, Jazz, Afro Caribbean, Afro Cuban, Latin and Funk.

Career 
Grammy nominated world class drummer and musician of international acclaim.  Over thirty years of performing, recording, touring, teaching and session music experience alongside some the greatest names in the industry. From Dizzy Gillespie at the start of his musical career in Havana, Cuba, to Michel Legrand, Carmen McRae, Paquitto D' Rivera, Arturo Sandoval, Ray Baretto, Mark Murphy, Chucho Valdés, Michael Brecker, Herbie Hancock, Mike Stern, Richard Bona, Rodrigues Brothers, Brian Lynch, Manuel Valera, Gonzalo Rubalcalba, Hugh Masakela, Kyle Eastwood, Omar Sosa to name but a few.

His playing has graced Original motion picture scores such as Random Hearts (1999) with Harrison Ford and For Love or Country: The Arturo Sandoval Story (2007) with Andy Garcia where he also makes a cameo appearance.

Ernesto has lived and worked in Havana, Cuba; Bogota, Colombia; Miami, USA;  and New York, USA; A family man and always passionate about music he now splits his time between London, UK and Athens, Greece with his wife and manager Kate Bellia-Simpson.

Discography 
 Omar Sosa and the NDR Big Band: Omar Sosa "Essensual" (working title) (Drums, percussion)
 Femi Tomowo "Music is the Feeling" (Drums)
 Omar Sosa "Ile" (Drums, percussion,vocals)
 Kyle Eastwood "Time Pieces" (Drums and arrangements)
 Gonzalo Rubalcalba "Suite Caminos" (Drums)
 Ramon Valle "Take Off" (Drums)
 Phil Robson "Immeasurable code" (Drums)
 Richard Bona "Bona Makes You Sweat"-Live in Hungary (Drums)
 Richard Bona "Tiki" (Drums)
 Paquito D"Rivera "Jazz Clazz" (Drums and Timbale) 
 Arturo Sandoval"For Love Or Country: The Arturo Sandoval Story"OMPST (Drums,Percussion and arrangements)
 Arturo Sandoval "Trumpet Evolution" (Drums)
 Arturo Sandoval "My Passion for the Piano" (Drums)
 Arturo Sandoval "Americana"(Drums)
 Dave Grusin "Random Hearts" OMPST (Drums and Percussion)
 Brian Lynch "Con Clave" (Drums)
 Helio Alves "Its Clear" (Drums)
 Edy Martinez "Midnight Jazz Affair" (Drums)
 Edy Martinez "Privilegio" (Drums)
 Perspectiva Group "Tiembla Tierra" (Drums and Timbale)
 Manuel Valera "Vientos" (Drums)
 Manuel Valera "Currents" (Drums)
 Roberto Occhipinti "Yemaya" (Drums)
 Samuel Torres "Skin Tones" (Drums and Percussion)
 Samuel Torres "Yaounde" (Drums)
 Candy Dulfer "What Does It Take?" (Timbale)
 Thalia "Thalia" (Drums)
 Galy Galiano "Sin Fronteras" (Timbales)
 John Di Martino "Romantic Jazz Trio: Jazz Mozart" (Drums)
 Charlie Zaa "El Mas Grande Sentimiento" (Drums and Synthesizer Drums)
 Pablo Mayor "Perro Amor" TV Soap Opera/Colombia (Drums)
 Ricardo Eddy Martinez"Bolero Jazz: Misty" (Drums)
 Olga Guillot "Faltaba Yo" (Drums and Percussion)
 Minione (Jopek / Rubacalba) having gone gold and now platinum

Accomplishments 
 2010 Grammy nomination for performing on Paquito D'Rivera 'Jazz Clazz' (2009)
 2016 Grammy nomination for performing on Gonzalo Rubalcaba's 'Suite Caminos' (2015)

References

1964 births
Living people
Jazz drummers
Cuban jazz musicians